"Uncleftish Beholding" (1989) is a short text by Poul Anderson, included in his anthology "All One Universe". It is  designed to illustrate what English might look like without its large number of loanwords from languages such as French, Greek, and Latin, especially with regard to the proportion of scientific words with origins in those languages. 

Written as a demonstration of linguistic purism in English, the work explains atomic theory using Germanic words almost exclusively and coining new words when necessary; many of these new words have cognates in modern German, an important scientific language in its own right. The title phrase uncleftish beholding calques "atomic theory."

To illustrate, the text begins:

Ymirstuff references Ymir, a giant in Norse mythology similar to Uranus in Greek mythology.

Glossary 

The vocabulary used in "Uncleftish Beholding" does not completely derive from Anglo-Saxon. Around, from Old French  (Modern French ), completely displaced Old English  (modern English  (now obsolete), cognate to German  and Latin ) and left no "native" English word for this concept. The text also contains the French-derived words rest, ordinary and sort.

The text gained increased exposure and popularity after being circulated around the Internet, and has served as inspiration for some inventors of Germanic English conlangs. Douglas Hofstadter, in discussing the piece in his book , jocularly refers to the use of only Germanic roots for scientific pieces as "Ander-Saxon."

See also
 Anglish
 Thing Explainer

References

External links
 

English language
Atomic physics
1989 documents
Works by Poul Anderson
Linguistic purism
Books written in fictional dialects